White Mountains Insurance Group is a diversified insurance and related financial services holding company based in Hamilton, Bermuda. Redomiciled from Delaware, United States, on October 25, 1999, the company conducts most of its business through its insurance subsidiaries and other affiliates.

The company owned the automobile insurer Esurance before selling it to Allstate for $1 billion.

Heritage

White Mountain Insurance Group began in the early 1980s by John J. Byrne, the man recruited by American Express to turn around troubled property and casualty insurer Fireman's Fund. When Byrne took Fireman's Fund public in 1985, it was the largest IPO in American history, and the insurer was sold to Allianz six years later. Upon completion of the Fireman's Fund sale in 1991, the remaining holding company and residual assets formed the starting point for the future White Mountains.

In December 2020, the company reported book value per share of $1,000.

Leadership

White Mountain Insurance's current director is CEO George Manning Rountree.

References

External links

Companies listed on the New York Stock Exchange
Insurance companies of Bermuda